The Big Ten Scoring Champion is an annual award given out at the conclusion of the Big Ten Conference regular season to the player who scored the most points in conference games during the season. 

The Scoring Champion was first awarded in 2015 and every year thereafter. It has been shared twice, in 2017 and 2023. Cole Caufield is the only player to win the award multiple times.

Award winners

Winners by school

Winners by position

References 

Awards established in 2015
Big Ten Conference ice hockey
College ice hockey trophies and awards in the United States